Stable equilibrium can refer to:

Homeostasis, a state of equilibrium used to describe organisms
Mechanical equilibrium, a state in which all particles in a system are at rest, and total force on each particle is permanently zero
Balance of nature, a theory in ecological science
Stability theory, a theory in mathematics
Mertens-stable equilibrium in game theory
Stochastically stable equilibrium in the game theory